Patrick Day (August 9, 1992 – October 16, 2019) was an American professional boxer. He died from brain trauma sustained in a knockout loss against Charles Conwell.

Early life and education
Day was born to Haitian immigrants in Freeport, New York, and was the youngest of four sons. His father was a doctor who used to box as a child, while his mother, Lyssa, was a translator at the United Nations. During his professional boxing career, he earned an associate degree in nutrition from Nassau Community College, and a bachelor's degree in health and wellness from Kaplan University.

Career
Day started boxing in 2006 under the guidance of former firefighter and boxing trainer Joe Higgins. In 2012, he won the New York Golden Gloves tournament. His amateur record was 75–5, including two national amateur championships. He was recognized as the number-one ranked amateur boxer in the United States in the 152-pound division, and served as a 2012 United States Olympic team alternate.

Day rose to be a top-10 ranked light middleweight for the WBC and IBF.  He also captured the regional WBC Continental Americas light middleweight title. Day won 17 of his 22 professional fights, with four defeats and one draw.

Death
Day suffered a traumatic brain injury during a knockout loss to Charles Conwell in a USBA super welterweight title bout on October 12, 2019, and died four days later.

Boxing announcer Michael Buffer described Day as a "wonderful young man" and that "everyone in the boxing community is crushed", while WBC president Mauricio Sulaiman said boxing had lost a "brave, kind and wonderful friend". Conwell posted an open letter online that expressed his sorrow and regret.

Professional boxing record

See also
List of deaths due to injuries sustained in boxing

References

1992 births
2019 deaths
People from Freeport, New York
Sportspeople from Nassau County, New York
Deaths due to injuries sustained in boxing
Place of death missing
Filmed deaths in sports
Kaplan University alumni
Boxers from New York (state)
American sportspeople of Haitian descent
Nassau Community College alumni
Middleweight boxers